Charleston Rambo (born August 10, 1999) is an American football wide receiver for the Orlando Guardians of the XFL. He played college football at Oklahoma before transferring to Miami and was signed as an undrafted free agent by the Carolina Panthers in 2022.

High school career
Rambo attended Cedar Hill High School in Cedar Hill, Texas, where he played high school football. As a senior in 2016, he had 87 receptions for 1,590 yards and 25 touchdowns. He committed to playing college football for Oklahoma.

College career
After redshirting his first year at Oklahoma in 2017, Rambo played in 12 games in 2018 and had eight receptions for 125 yards and a touchdown. He took over as a starter in 2019 and started all 14 games. He finished second on the team to CeeDee Lamb with 43 receptions for 743 yards and five touchdowns.

Professional career

Carolina Panthers 
Rambo signed with the Carolina Panthers as an undrafted free agent on May 1, 2022. He was waived on August 30.

Orlando Guardians 
On November 17, 2022, Rambo was drafted by the Orlando Guardians of the XFL.

References

External links
 Carolina Panthers bio
Miami Hurricanes bio
Oklahoma Sooners bio

1999 births
Living people
People from Cedar Hill, Texas
Players of American football from Texas
Sportspeople from the Dallas–Fort Worth metroplex
American football wide receivers
Oklahoma Sooners football players
Miami Hurricanes football players
Carolina Panthers players
Orlando Guardians players